Grace (released 2001 by EmArcy, international release by Universal Music) is an album by the Norwegian pianist Ketil Bjørnstad.

Reception 
The Panorama review by Harald Christian Langaas (15.2.2001, © Panorama Media) awarded the album four stars, stating:

The Amazon.com readers review awarded the album 4½ stars.

Track listing
All compositions by Ketil Bjørnstad.
 «No Man Is An Iland...» (3:53)
 «Lovers' Infiniteness» (6:44)
 «The Bait» (2:41)
 «White» (1:33)
 «The Anniversary» (5:24)
 «Love's Growth» (5:56)
 «Song» (5:13)
 «Love's Usury» (6:13)
 «Naked» (2:51)
 «Grace» (4:35)
 «The Indifferent» (4:06)
 «Mystery» (3:25)
 «The Canonization» (5:50)
 «Take A Flat Map...» (4:32)
 «No Man Is An Iland... (Finale)» (3:39)

Personnel
 Ketil Bjørnstad - piano
 Anneli Drecker - vocals
 Bendik Hofseth - saxophones & vocals
 Arild Andersen - double bass
 Trilok Gurtu - percussion
 Eivind Aarset - guitar & electronics
 Jan Bang - samplings & electronics

References

External links 
 Ketil Bjørnstad Official Website

2001 albums
Ketil Bjørnstad albums